Sherrie Rose is an American actress, producer, director, and screenwriter. She co-produced, directed, wrote and starred in the 1999 road drama Me and Will, starring Patrick Dempsey. The film opened the Women in Film Series for Sundance and appeared in many film festivals.

Life and career
Rose has also appeared in over 65 films including Killer Crocodile (1989), No Retreat, No Surrender 3: Blood Brothers (1990), The King of the Kickboxers (1990), Maximum Force (1992), Unlawful Entry (1992), New Crime City (1994), Demon Knight (1995) and Black Scorpion II (1997), and television shows including Miami Vice, Married With Children, Charmed, and Sons of Anarchy, two "Tales from the Crypt" episodes and the books entitled Tales from the Crypt and Girlfriends.

Personal life
In 2009, Rose told Us Weekly that she had a son with Jeffrey Dean Morgan, born circa 2004–2005.

Filmography

Film

Television

References

External links
 

Living people
American film actresses
American television actresses
Year of birth missing (living people)
21st-century American women